Charles Trubshaw FRIBA (1840 – 15 February 1917) was an architect specifically associated with railway buildings on the London and North Western Railway and Midland Railway lines.

Career

He trained as an architect in the office of his father, also Charles Trubshaw (1811–1862), a civil engineer and also county surveyor for Staffordshire.

He was appointed Associate of the Royal Institute of British Architects on 6 February 1864, and Fellow of the Royal Institute of British Architects on 6 November 1882.

He was on the engineering and architectural staff of the London and North Western Railway 1864–1874. He was then architect to the Northern Division of the Midland Railway from 1874. On the death of John Holloway Sanders in 1884 he became chief architect to the Midland Railway, and held this position until 1905.

Work

Kettering railway station 
Shipley railway station
Skipton railway station
Hellifield railway station 1880
Kimberley West railway station 1882
Keighley railway station 1883–1885
Midland Hotel, Bradford 1885–1890
Oakhurst House, Derbyshire 1888 Enlargement 
Bradford Forster Square railway station 1890
Bingley railway station 1892
Derby railway station 1893 – extensions (demolished)
Midland Railway Institute, Derby 1894
Leicester railway station 1892–1894
Langley Mill railway station 1895
Midland Hotel, Manchester 1898 – 1903
Sheffield station 1905 enlargement

References

Steam Index

1840 births
1917 deaths
19th-century English architects
British railway architects
Fellows of the Royal Institute of British Architects
Midland Railway people
London and North Western Railway people
Architects from Staffordshire
Associates of the Royal Institute of British Architects